Aleksandr Zybin (20 March 1951 – 4 November 2010) was a Soviet sailor. He competed at the 1980 Summer Olympics and the 1988 Summer Olympics.

References

External links
 

1951 births
2010 deaths
Soviet male sailors (sport)
Olympic sailors of the Soviet Union
Sailors at the 1980 Summer Olympics – Tornado
Sailors at the 1988 Summer Olympics – Star
Sportspeople from Nizhny Novgorod